Hatem Mohammad Yusuf Aqel is a Jordanian footballer of Palestinian descent.

International goals

Honors and Participation in International Tournaments

In AFC Asian Cups 
2004 Asian Cup
2011 Asian Cup

In Arab Nations Cup 
2002 Arab Nations Cup

In Pan Arab Games
1999 Pan Arab Games

In WAFF Championships 
2000 WAFF Championship
2002 WAFF Championship
2004 WAFF Championship
2007 WAFF Championship
2008 WAFF Championship 
2014 WAFF Championship

See also
 List of men's footballers with 100 or more international caps

References

External links 
 
 
 
 
 Profile at the Jordan Football Association  

1978 births
Living people
Association football defenders
Jordanian people of Palestinian descent
Jordanian footballers
Jordan international footballers
FIFA Century Club
Jordanian Pro League players
Saudi Professional League players
2004 AFC Asian Cup players
2011 AFC Asian Cup players
Jordanian expatriate footballers
Expatriate footballers in Saudi Arabia
Jordanian expatriate sportspeople in Saudi Arabia
Al-Raed FC players
Al-Faisaly SC players
That Ras Club players
Al-Arabi (Jordan) players
Sportspeople from Amman